Chwalibożyce  is a village in the administrative district of Gmina Oława, within Oława County, Lower Silesian Voivodeship, in south-western Poland.

Notable residents
 Manfred Beutner (1914–2002), officer

References

Villages in Oława County